Kumbalam, is a place in Kollam, Kerala, India. It has a population of around 4,000 and is a part of Perayam grama panchayat. It is in the bank of Astamudi lake and houses an international school.  Nearby places are Karikuzhi, Kottappuram and Perayam.

Education 
International School
St. Joseph International Academy follows the Indian Certificate of Secondary Education (ICSE) syllabus. The school is owned and operated by the Valiavila Foundation, a registered charitable trust led by Dr. Joseph D Fernandez.  
Higher Secondary School
St. Michael's Vocational Higher Secondary School
Lower Primary School
St. Mary’s Lower Primary School

Library 
Kumbalam has had a public library since 1951.

Religion 
Kumbalam is one of the biggest parishes under Quilon Diocese. St. Michael's Church in Kumbalam is the second largest church in Quilon Diocese. Fr. Lucas Fernandez, Fr. Tobias Fernandez, Msgr Charles M Fernandez, Fr. Dr. Stanislaus M Fernandez SDB, Rev. Dr. Samuel Ryan SJ, Teacher Angelus M Fernandez, Dr.Joseph D Fernandez , Prof. KS Peter, and Prof. S Varghese are from Kumbalam.

Hospital 
Primary Health Centre

References 

Villages in Kollam district